Mordellistena solarii is a species of beetle in the genus Mordellistena of the family Mordellidae. It was described by Franciscolo in 1942.

References

External links
Coleoptera. BugGuide.

Beetles described in 1942
solarii